Honey Bafna is an Indian television actor who appears in Bengali TV shows, OTT and films.

Career 
Coming from a completely non-acting background, Honey started his acting career in Bengali serials as a junior artist with non-credited roles. His first credited television appearance was in Star Jalsha's Bengali serial Tumi Ashbe Bole (2015), where he played the negative character of Dr. Vivaan Chakraborty. He came to be known for playing the role of 'Balaram'  in Star Jalsha's mythological serial Bhakter Bhagobaan Shri Krishna, and as Rishi in Zee Bangla's popular family drama Bokul Kotha. He appeared as Dwarakanath Ganguly, in the Star Jalsha period drama Prothoma Kadambini, based on the life of Bengal's first practising lady doctor Kadambini Ganguly.Honey moved into the OTT space with a role in Hoichoi's Bodhon.Honey is marking his big screen debut with ‘Swapnouraan’.

Personal life 
Honey is currently single. He is a self confessed foodie and an ardent sports enthusiast. He graduated in Mathematics from Ashutosh College, and worked as a Medical Representative before joining the television industry. He also conducts acting workshops at a private acting school, when time permits.

Television

Over The Top Platform

Awards and recognition

References

External links

Living people
Male actors from Kolkata
Indian male television actors
1987 births
Bengali male television actors
Asutosh College alumni